RCA Communication Systems is a private label brand used by Discount Two Way Radio Corporation (DTWR) to market its own brand Two-way radio and related communications equipment using the RCA logo under licence from Technicolor SA

History
In 2009, an agreement was made between Discount Two Way Radio Corporation (DTWR) and Technicolor SA to manufacture Two-way radio products under the RCA brand.

RCA Two-way radios is the official sponsor of the United States Bobsled and Skeleton Team for the 2022 Winter Olympic Games in Beijing.

Markets

There are more than 100 authorized resellers of RCA Two-way radios in the USA. In Canada, RCA Two-way radios are exclusively distributed by Allcan Distributors.

Products

The RCA Two-way radio range consists of both analog and digital models. The RCA PRODIGI™ is the digital line of Two-way radios. The model RDR26X0 is assembled in the United States.

Two-way radio Models

References

Technology companies
Radio manufacturers